Herpyza is a genus of flowering plants in the legume family, Fabaceae. It belongs to the subfamily Faboideae. It is endemic to Cuba.

References 

Phaseoleae
Fabaceae genera

Flora of Cuba